Time Is the Sulphur in the Veins of the Saint – An Excursion on Satan's Fragmenting Principle is the eighth studio album by Austrian black metal band Abigor. It was released on 18 January 2010.

Track listing

Credits 
 A.R. (Arthur Rosar) - Vocals
 P.K. (Virus 666, Peter Kubik) - Guitars
 T.T. (Thomas Tannenberger) - Guitars, Drums, Bass

External links 
 Album, Encyclopaedia Metallum

2010 albums
Abigor albums